Tommy Hill is a former British motorcycle road racer, born 9 February 1985 in Beckenham, Kent. His greatest success was becoming the British Superbike Champion for 2011. He also competed in the World Superbike and World Supersport championships.

Hill quit motorcycle racing at the end of 2012, instead started working as a self-employed graphic designer, but announced in late 2014 that he would be running a British Superbike team during 2015.

After several months of his first season as a team manager with Be Wiser Kawasaki, Hill left in August 2015, and the team folded in September. Hill announced in October 2015 that he would be running his own team named THM – Tommy Hill Motorsport – for 2016 with Yamaha R1 machines, backed by ePayMe, with riders John Hopkins and Stuart Easton.

Personal
Hill's early racing life included a near-fatal motocross accident in which he lost a kidney and his spleen. As a result, medical problems including a bout of food poisoning in 2006 have dogged his career, and require him to take Penicillin every day. His brother Jimmy also raced.

Starting out
He switched to road racing in 2001, and first earned his BSB ride by winning the Virgin Mobile Yamaha R6 Cup in 2003, finishing every race in the process.

British Superbikes 2004–07
In his first BSB season he became the youngest rider ever to start a race on the front row of the grid, and he was the only one of the team's four 2004 riders to be retained for 2005 – team boss Rob McElnea commenting that "He really did prove himself beyond everyone’s expectations this year".

In 2005 he took 2 further front row starts, as well as his first BSB win at Cadwell Park, finishing 12th overall in the series.

For the 2006 British Superbike season he was the only Yamaha rider to retain his ride, leading a young team with Billy McConnell and Kieran Clarke. Hill was also entered for the Superbike World Championship race at Silverstone as a wild card. In changeable qualifying conditions he stunned the experienced regulars by taking pole position, and then finished both races in the lower reaches of the points. He finished the BSB season eighth overall

In 2007, Hill was joined in the Virgin Yamaha squad by James Haydon, who returned to the team for whom he raced in 2001 and 2004. From 12th on the grid in damp conditions he briefly led the second race of round 4 at Oulton Park, but ultimately faded to 7th, the Yamaha failing to match other bikes on performance.

He also made a handful of World Supersport rides on an SSP Yamaha alongside his 2007 BSB commitments

World Supersport 2008
For 2008 Hill switched to the series full-time, with the Hannspree Altea Honda team. On his very first test he crashed, breaking his femur, ankle and hand, causing him to miss the first five rounds of the season.
 Hill returned at the Nürburgring, qualifying in 9th place. But in the race he was involved in an incident at turn one where wildcard rider Arne Tode caused a massive pile-up, and as a result Hill rebroke his femur, putting him out for the rest of the season.

World Superbikes and return to British Superbikes 2009 – 
The Althea team kept faith in him for 2009, signing him to be their sole World Superbike rider, owing to his BSB experience. However he was uncompetitive, and lost the ride midseason to young Frenchman Matthieu Lagrive.

He joined Worx Crescent Suzuki as a replacement for the injured Sylvain Guintoli from the Mallory Park round, qualifying 2nd. He was competitive in race 1 despite the electronic engine management system failing before the start, until chaos and controversy struck. He was running second when Josh Brookes lost control of his bike and catapulted race leader Simon Andrews, dropping oil from Brookes' Honda. Hill was one of five other riders who either crashed or downed their bikes to avoid crashing. The red flag was shown, but these seven riders were omitted from the results, as they were not running at the time of the red flag. Brookes received a two-meeting ban for his mistake. Hill kept the ride for the next meeting at Brands Hatch on a three race weekend. Hill rode well at Brands Hatch but after the meeting it was confirmed that Sylvain Guintoli would return to the Worx Suzuki team for the remainder of the season. After missing the Cadwell Park round Hill returned to BSB for the Hydrex Honda team, taking the seat from Karl Harris after he was sacked.
Hill adapted quickly to the Hydrex Honda, gaining 7th and 6th-place finishes in his first outing at Croft, two fifths at Silverstone, and podium places at Oulton Park.

For 2010 Hill joined Worx Crescent Suzuki full-time, alongside former World Superbike race winner Yukio Kagayama. He took victory in the season opener at Brands Hatch, before finishing second to James Ellison in race two. He led the championship by 36 points at one stage. Poorer meetings at Cadwell Park and Knockhill eroded his championship lead, but regained it with three podiums at Snetterton. Hill was one of the central subjects of the film I, Superbiker, which recorded his 2010 British Superbike Championship season.

On 10 November 2010 Hill signed to Swan Yamaha full-time, alongside Supersport champion Michael Laverty. He came second in the opening race at Brands Hatch Indy and took victory in the second race. This gave him lead in the championship. At Oulton Park, the weekend after, he got pole position in qualifying and topped the time sheet. However, during the warm-up session, Loris Baz crashed moments before, leaving fluid on the track, this caused Hill to fall and sustain an injury to the left shoulder. Later an update said that Hill's injuries would rule him out of the races ahead., However Hill was back at Croft Circuit in May. He made history at Knockhill Racing Circuit by taking his first double win in the championship and putting him back on top form to fight for the championship title.

Career statistics
Stats correct as of 23 September 2012

All Time

By championship

British Superbike Championship

Notes
1. – Hill qualified for "The Showdown" part of the BSB season, thus before the 11th round he was awarded 500 points plus the podium credits he had gained throughout the season. Podium credits are given to anyone finishing 1st, 2nd or 3rd, with 3,2 and 1 points awarded respectively.

Superbike World Championship

Supersport World Championship

References

External links
 World Superbike ride

1985 births
Living people
People from Tandridge (district)
English motorcycle racers
British Supersport Championship riders
British Superbike Championship riders
Superbike World Championship riders
Supersport World Championship riders